The Burke County School District is a public school district in Burke County, Georgia, United States, based in Waynesboro. It serves the communities of Girard, Keysville, Midville, Vidette, and Waynesboro.

Schools
The Burke County School District has three elementary schools, one middle school, and one high school.

Elementary schools
Blakeney Elementary School
Sardis-Girard-Alexander Elementary School
Waynesboro Primary School

Middle school
Burke County Middle School

High school
Burke County High School

Alternative school
Burke County Alternative School

References

External links

School districts in Georgia (U.S. state)
Education in Burke County, Georgia